Sahajanpur is a village and gram panchayat in Hardoi district, Uttar Pradesh, India. The village has several public and many private educational institutions. Shivalaya is an ancient building here.

Demographics 
The population of Sahajanpur was 2000 as per 2011 census of India which has increased to 3000 in 2011. As of June 2014, the population is 4000.
.

Education system 
There are three primary schools in Sahjanpur.

References

External links
 [www.sahjanpur.in]

Villages in Hardoi district